Number 13 can refer to:

 13 (number)
 Number 13 (comics) a comic strip in The Beano
 Number 13 (1922 film), a film by Alfred Hitchcock and starring Ernest Thesiger which was shot but never completed and is believed to be lost
 "Number 13" (2006 film), an adaptation of the M. R. James ghost story
 Number 13-class battleship
 "Number 13" (short story), by M. R. James
 "Number Thirteen", a song by Red Fang from the album Murder the Mountains

See also
 13 (disambiguation)
 XIII (disambiguation)